Filip Pyrochta (born June 24, 1996) is a Czech professional ice hockey defenceman for Luleå HF of the Swedish Hockey League (SHL). He formerly played with the Milwaukee Admirals of the American Hockey League (AHL) as a prospect under contract with the Nashville Predators of the National Hockey League (NHL).

Playing career
Pyrochta first played as a youth at the under-16 level with SK Horácká Slavia Třebíč before joining HC Bílí Tygři Liberec. He made his professional debut playing a solitary game on loan with HC Benátky nad Jizerou in the Czech 1. Liga during the 2012–13 season. He made his first senior appearance for HC Bílí Tygři Liberec in the 2013 European Trophy.

With an ambition to reach the NHL, Pyrochta opted to continue his development by playing major junior hockey in North America. He was selected in the first round, 23rd overall, by the Victoriaville Tigres of the Quebec Major Junior Hockey League at the 2014 CHL Import Draft.

He played two seasons in the QMJHL, however was left undrafted and returned to HC Bílí Tygři Liberec of the Czech Extraliga for the 2016–17 season. He played his first season in the ELH, posting 6 points from the blueline as Liberec lead the league with 103 points.

In his second season with HC Bílí Tygři Liberec in 2017–18, Pyrochta recorded three goals and 12 points in 42 games as a 21-year-old. On May 7, 2018, having showed a continued development, Pyrochta was signed to a two-year, entry-level contract with the Nashville Predators of the NHL. On May 25, 2019, the Predators and Pyrochta's mutually parted ways, and on May 28, he signed a contract with HC Kometa Brno.

During the 2021–22 season, Pyrochta made 43 regular season appearances with SaiPa in the Liiga before transferring to the SHL in signing a contract with Luleå HF on 15 February 2022.

Career statistics

Regular season and playoffs

International

References

External links

1996 births
Living people
Atlanta Gladiators players
HC Benátky nad Jizerou players
Czech ice hockey defencemen
HC Bílí Tygři Liberec players
HC Kometa Brno players
Luleå HF players
Milwaukee Admirals players
SaiPa players
Sportspeople from Třebíč
Val-d'Or Foreurs players
Victoriaville Tigres players
HC Vítkovice players
Czech expatriate ice hockey players in Canada
Czech expatriate ice hockey players in the United States
Czech expatriate ice hockey players in Sweden
Czech expatriate ice hockey players in Finland